Ortholasmatinae is a subfamily of harvestmen with 27 described species in 7 genera.

Species

Selected species:

 Asiolasma Martens, 2019
Asiolasma ailaoshan (Zhang, Zhao & Zhang, 2018)
Asiolasma angka (Schwendinger & Gruber, 1992)
Asiolasma billsheari Martens, 2019
Asiolasma damingshan (Zhang & Zhang, 2013)
Asiolasma jeurgengruberi Martens, 2019
Asiolasma schwendingeri Martens, 2019
 Cladolasma Suzuki, 1963
Cladolasma parvulum Suzuki, 1963
 Cryptolasma Cruz-López, Cruz-Bonilla & Francke, 2018
Cryptolasma aberrante Cruz-López, Cruz-Bonilla & Francke, 2018
Cryptolasma citlaltepetl Cruz-López, Cruz-Bonilla & Francke, 2018
 Dendrolasma Banks, 1894
Dendrolasma dentipalpe Shear & Gruber, 1983
Dendrolasma mirabile Banks, 1894
 Martensolasma Shear, 2006
Martensolasma catrina Cruz-López, 2017
Martensolasma jocheni Shear, 2006
 Ortholasma Banks, 1894
Ortholasma colossus Shear, 2010
Ortholasma coronadense Cockerell, 1916
Ortholasma levipes Shear & Gruber, 1983
Ortholasma pictipes Banks, 1911
Ortholasma rugosum Banks, 1894
 Trilasma Goodnight & Goodnight, 1942
Trilasma bolivari Goodnight & Goodnight, 1942
Trilasma chipinquensis Shear, 2010
Trilasma hidalgo Shear, 2010
Trilasma petersprousei Shear, 2010
Trilasma ranchonuevo Shear, 2010
Trilasma sbordonii Šilhavý, 1973
Trilasma tempestado Shear, 2010
Trilasma trispinosum Shear, 2010
Trilasma tropicum Shear, 2010

References

Harvestmen
Arthropod subfamilies